Viral: The Search for the Origin of COVID-19 is a 2021 book by Canadian molecular biologist Alina Chan and British science writer Matt Ridley. The authors describe ongoing investigations into the origin of COVID-19.
An updated version was published in June 2022.

Reviews
The book has received mixed reviews.<ref name="Others">
 
 </p>
 </ref> The Wall Street Journal'''s Adam O'Neal said the book has compiled "perhaps the most comprehensive case for the lab-leak theory currently available". Michael Hiltzik wrote in the Los Angeles Times that the authors "place[d] a conspiracy theory between hardcovers to masquerade as sober scientific inquiry." A review in The Times of London described it as concluding that the lab-leak hypothesis is "highly possible" rather than "definitely true". Writing in The Guardian, medical journalist Mark Honigsbaum considered the book's main argument to be unconvincing, and some of Chan and Ridley's descriptions to be "highly misleading". Steven Poole writing for the Daily Telegraph'' was unconvinced by the central thesis although he did support the authors in their plea to discontinue gain of function research.

References 

2021 non-fiction books
Books by Matt Ridley
HarperCollins books
Books about the COVID-19 pandemic